Olena Buryak (born 8 February 1988 in Mykolaiv) is a Ukrainian rower.

She competed at the 2012 Summer Olympics in the women's double sculls with Hanna Kravchenko.  She was part of the Ukrainian women's quadruple sculls team, with Daryna Verkhohliad, Anastasiia Kozhenkova and Yevheniya Nimchenko, at the 2016 Summer Olympics.  The team finished 4th.  She was also part of the Ukrainian quadruple sculls team that finished second at the 2010 World Rowing Championships.  The team consisted of Buryak, Kozhenkova, Kateryna Tarasenko and Yana Dementieva.

She rows for Spartak Kiev.

Indoor rowing career 
Buryak is a multiple world record holder in women's indoor rowing, and was the fastest woman ever over the 2000 metres distance until Brooke Mooney surpassed her in 2021.

She won the CRASH-B Sprints in 2013 and 2017.

References 

 

1988 births
Living people
Ukrainian female rowers
Sportspeople from Mykolaiv
Rowers at the 2012 Summer Olympics
Rowers at the 2016 Summer Olympics
Olympic rowers of Ukraine
World Rowing Championships medalists for Ukraine
World Games gold medalists
Competitors at the 2017 World Games
Universiade bronze medalists for Ukraine
Universiade medalists in rowing
European Rowing Championships medalists
Medalists at the 2013 Summer Universiade
21st-century Ukrainian women